"Hard Coming Love" is the second song on the 1968 album The United States of America, by the band The United States of America. It was written by Joe Byrd and Dorothy Moskowitz and is sung by Moskowitz.

2004 single
The song was released as a 7" single by Sundazed Records in 2004 as a part of their "Kustom Shop" of original releases. Its B-side was the "Osamu’s Birthday". The originally-unissued "Osamu's Birthday" has a strange vocal track which Moskowitz recorded by singing the lyrics phonetically backwards, then the track was reversed for an other-worldly effect.

Both these songs are previously unissued versions recorded live-in-the-studio, 1967. They are different from the versions that appear on the 2004 bonus track version of the band's only album.

Track listing

Side A
 "Hard Coming Love" (Joe Byrd, Dorothy Moskowitz) - 4:53

Side B
 "Osamu's Birthday" (Byrd) - 2:45

References

External links
7" Single at Sundazed Records site

1968 songs
2004 singles
The United States of America (band) songs